The 1958 Arizona State Sun Devils football team was an American football team that represented Arizona State University in the Border Conference during the 1958 NCAA University Division football season. In their first season under head coach Frank Kush, the Sun Devils compiled a 7–3 record (4–1 against Border opponents) and outscored their opponents by a combined total of 271 to 131.

The team's statistical leaders included John Hangartner with 1,208 passing yards, Leon Burton with 642 rushing yards, and Bill Spanko with 463 receiving yards.

Schedule

Personnel

Season summary

Detroit
During a flight layover in Kansas City, head coach Frank Kush had the team deplane and practice on field adjacent to the airport. Kush then proceeded to bench the seniors for the first half of the game.

References

Arizona State
Arizona State Sun Devils football seasons
Arizona State Sun Devils football